= Children's House, Rijeka =

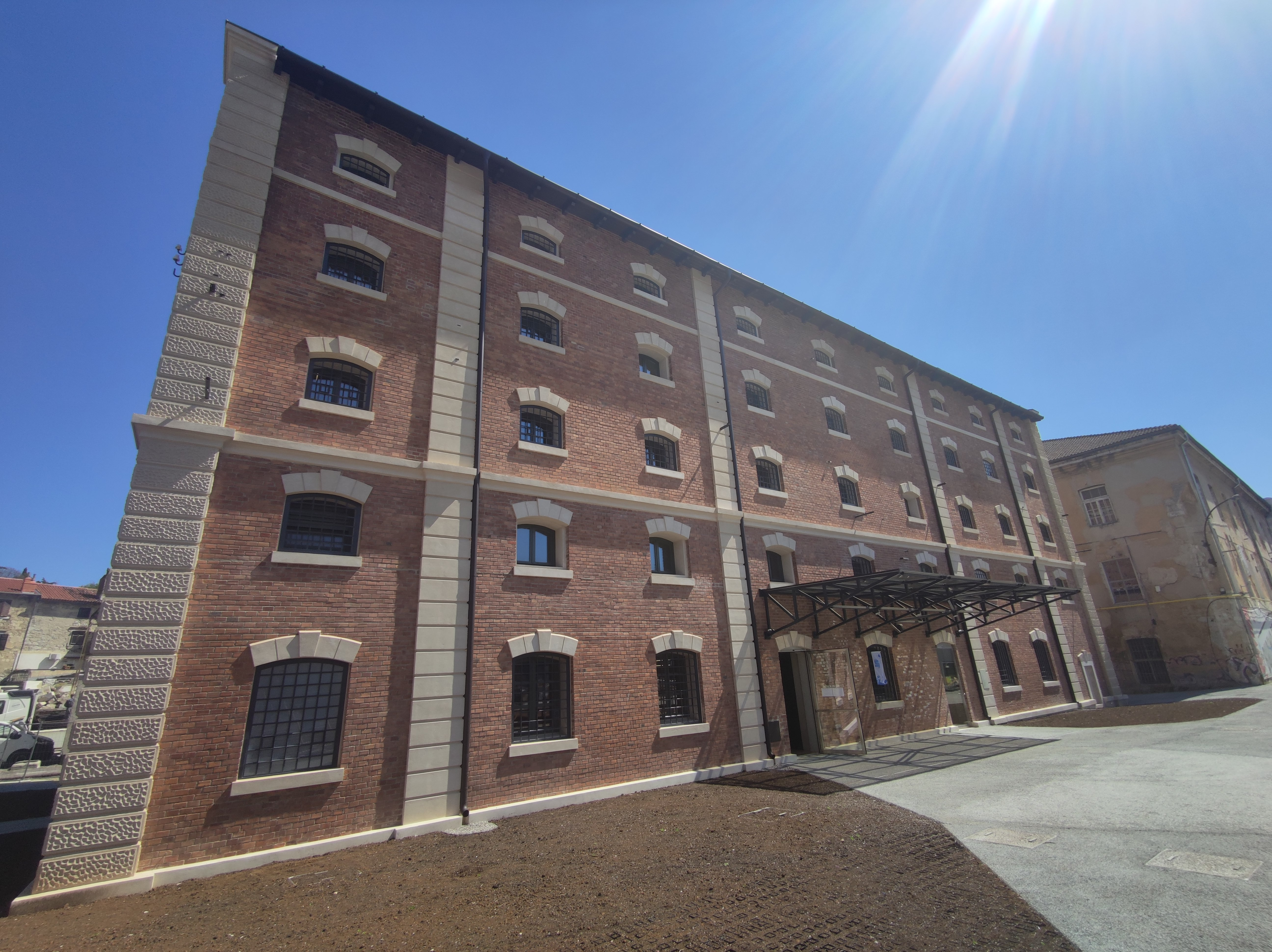
The Children’s House, after the renovation of a brick wall building in q-Art Benčić

The Children's House is a renovated building in the new so-called q-Art, art quarter of the city of Rijeka, intended for public children's cultural and artistic events. The Children's House is programmatically embodied by the following city institutions: the Rijeka City Library, the Rijeka City Puppet Theatre, Art Kino Croatia and the Museum of Modern and Contemporary Art. It was created by repurposing the drying and tobacco storage facilities of the former industrial complex "Rikard Benčić", and opened in early 2021.

== History ==
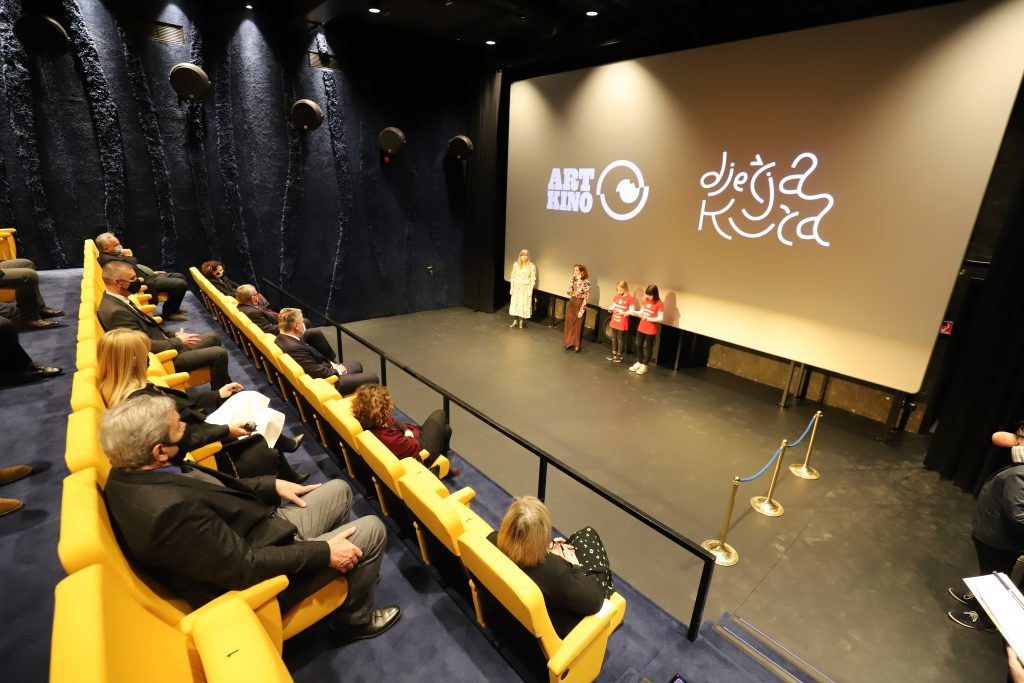
Opening at the cinema (Art Kino)

The building where the Children's House is located was built at the end of the 19th century as part of the "Royal Hungarian Tobacco Factory", on the site of two older buildings. Its particularity is the construction of solid red brick, which sets it apart from other buildings. After the Second World War, the brick building became part of the newly established Marine Engine Factory "Rikard Benčić". With the bankruptcy of the factory in the 1990s, the building was abandoned and the interior and floors collapsed. The area around the building was used as a public parking lot.

Its architectural and historical value lies in the fact that it represents an example of industrial architecture of the late 19th century and warehouse typology. As such, it had to be preserved in any future revitalization process while creating conditions for new functions. In 2014, the concept of renovating the building as a place for culture, art and educational work with children in the context of non-formal education was created.

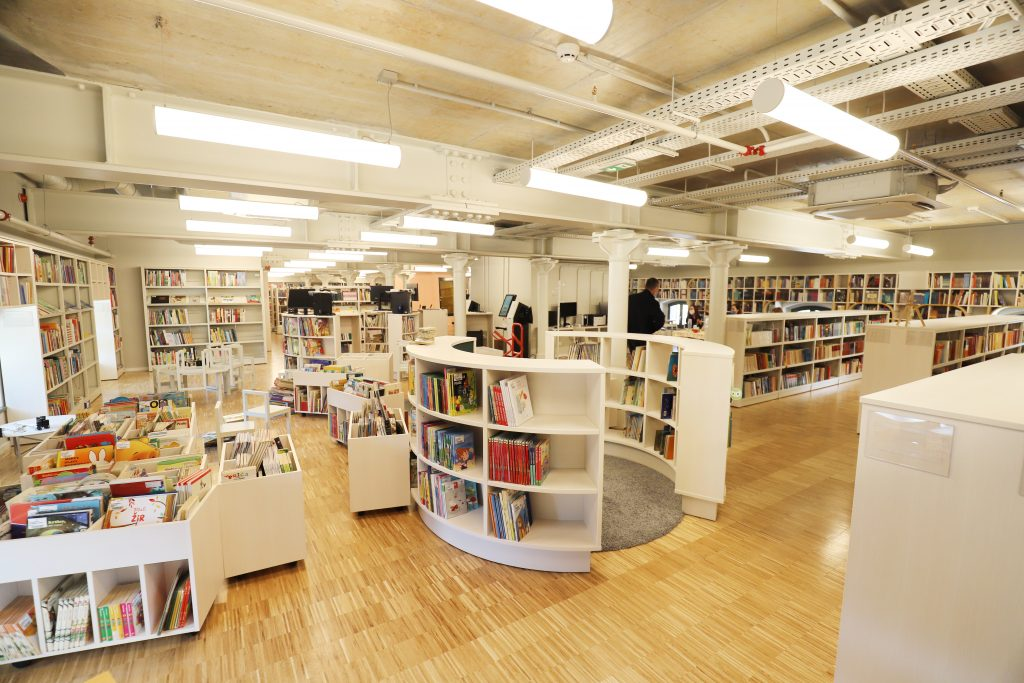
Children's library department Stribor

The construction was made according to the project of the architect Saša Randić, and it was carried out by ING-GRAD d.o.o., selected after the public procurement process. Construction work began in February 2019, and it was completed in February 2021 when the Children's House was handed over for service to its users. It is equipped mainly with Croatian designer products and furniture from the company Prostoria, and opened to the public on March 26, 2021.

== Concept ==
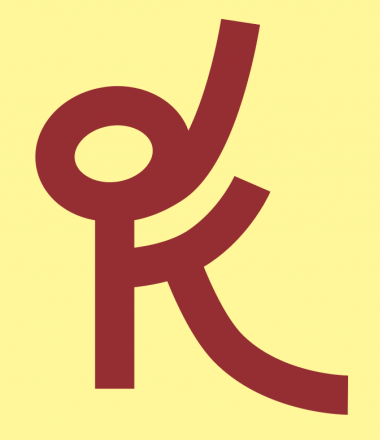
acronym logo

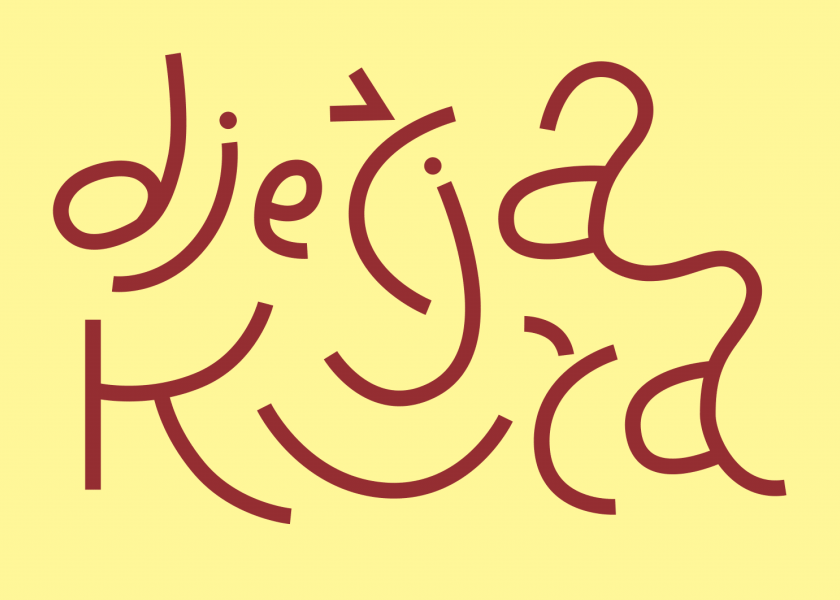
logo - full visuals

The Children's House integrates the educational part of working with children of city cultural institutions: the Rijeka City Library, Art Kino, the Rijeka City Puppet Theatre and the Museum of Modern and Contemporary Art, which are in the Children's House. The basic work principle is a synergy of programs intended for children and their multidisciplinary approach.

The Children's Department of the Rijeka City Library - Stribor operates in the Children's House, on 450 square meters, with 32 thousand books, picture books and comics, as well as 3D printers. A special cinema hall for children was created as the first in Croatia, but also two studios for the production of Art Kino.

== Events and projects ==
The Children's House partners create specific projects and events for children and parents such as the Good Children's Book Week, the children's magazine Brickzine and the Tobogan festival.
